Jo Jin-ho (born 10 July 2003) is a South Korean footballer who currently plays as a midfielder for Fenerbahçe.

Club career

Early life
Jo took an interest in football from a young age, first playing at the Daedong Elementary School in 2014. He was recruited by Jeonbuk Hyundai Motors ahead of the 2016 season, and spent six full seasons with the North Jeolla Province-based club.

Fenerbahçe
In March 2022, after FIFA intervention, Jo signed an amateur contract with Turkish side Fenerbahçe. Since joining, he has already trained with the first team.

On February 17, 2023, he signed three and half year professional contract.

International career
Jo has represented South Korea from under-14 to under-17 level.

Style of play
A technically gifted player, Jo has been likened to former Spanish international David Silva for his dribbling ability and range of passes.

References

2003 births
Living people
South Korean footballers
South Korea youth international footballers
Association football midfielders
Jeonbuk Hyundai Motors players
Fenerbahçe S.K. footballers
South Korean expatriate footballers
South Korean expatriate sportspeople in Turkey
Expatriate footballers in Turkey